PSR B0329+54 is a pulsar approximately 3,460 light-years away in the constellation of Camelopardalis. It completes one rotation every 0.71452 seconds and is approximately 5 million years old.

The emissions of this pulsar and the Vela Pulsar were converted into audible sound by the French composer Gérard Grisey, and used as such in the piece Le noir de l'étoile (1989–90).

Planetary system

In 1979, two extrasolar planets were announced to be orbiting the pulsar (being classified as pulsar planets). Later observations did not support this conclusion. More recently, a 2017 analysis indicates that a long-period pulsar planet remains a possibility.

See also 
 PSR B1257+12
 PSR J1719-1438

References

Pulsars
Camelopardalis (constellation)
Hypothetical planetary systems
J03325936+5434448